is a Japanese politician. He is a member of the House of Councillors since 2013, representing the Komeito party.

Career 
He was born in Nagano and graduated from the law department of the University of Tokyo in 1998. He worked for Citibank for eight years after graduation, becoming a vice president in its legal department, then left the company to obtain an MBA from IESE Business School in Spain. In 2008, he joined Booz and Company as a management consultant.

He first ran for office in the 2013 House of Councillors election as a Komeito candidate for the national proportional representation district.

In August 2017, he was named Parliamentary Vice-Secretary for Economy, Trade and Industry, overseeing the Ministry of Economy, Trade and Industry. He concurrently serves as Parliamentary Vice-Minister of Cabinet Office and Parliamentary Vice-Minister for Reconstruction.

Policy positions 
 Constitutional revision
 During his 2013 election campaign, Hiraki expressed opposition to amending Article 9 of the Japanese Constitution.
 Collective self-defense
 During his 2013 election campaign, Hiraki expressed opposition to re-interpreting the constitution so as to permit collective self-defense. However, during deliberations over the 2015 defense bill, he said that he did not remember taking this position.

References

External links 
 Website

1974 births
Living people
University of Tokyo alumni
People from Nagano Prefecture
Members of the House of Councillors (Japan)
Komeito politicians
Citigroup people